The Kampung Raja Uda Komuter station is a commuter train stop located in Kampung Raja Uda, Klang, Selangor and served by the Port Klang Line of the KTM Komuter railway system.

The Kampung Raja Uda Komuter station was built in suburban area and named after the village, Kampung Raja Uda, located northern east from Port Klang.

Kampung Raja Uda is a very convenient location, it only takes 10 minutes to Federal Highway, Kesas Highway, NKVE Highway.

External links
Kampung Raja Uda KTM Komuter Station

Railway stations in Selangor
Rapid transit stations in Selangor
Port Klang Line